During the siege of Naģykanizsa in 1601, a small Ottoman force held the fortress of Naģykanizsa in western Hungary against a much larger coalition army of the Habsburg monarchy, while inflicting heavy losses on its besiegers.

This battle was part of the Long War between the Ottoman Empire and the House of Habsburg, lasting from 1593 to 1606.

Background
The April 21, 1521 gift from Holy Roman Emperor Charles V to his brother, Ferdinand I, of his Austrian territories created a Spanish branch of the Habsburgs as well as an Austrian branch who held the kingdoms of Bohemia and Hungary and also the title of Holy Roman Emperor after the death of Charles in 1558.

The decisive defeat by Suleiman the Magnificent of King Louis II of Hungary and Bohemia at the Battle of Mohács in 1526 brought about the fall of the Jagiellon dynasty. Louis, the adopted son of Maximilian I, Holy Roman Emperor, was killed in this battle and died childless at nineteen. Rival kings ruled for a time during the civil war that followed. John Zápolya (Hungarian:János Szapolyai) had not participated in Mohács and therefore was the only Hungarian aristocrat left with an army. The rival claimant was Louis' brother-in-law, Ferdinand I.

After the Ottoman capture in 1541 of central Buda, which eventually merged with nearby Pest to become Budapest, the Kingdom of Hungary broke in three. Royal Hungary in the west came under Habsburg control and the Principality of Transylvania, or Eastern Hungarian Kingdom, became an Ottoman vassal state under János and later his son, who fled to Lippa with his mother after the fall of Buda.

A period known as the fortress wars began. The Habsburgs built 100-120 forts they called the Bastion of Christianity, with the most important at Croatia, Slavonia, Kanizsa, Győr, Bányavidék, and Upper Hungary. A fleet of sloops based in Komárom defended the Danube. The Ottomans also had 100-130 fortresses, at Buda-Pest, Esztergom, and Temesvár.

The long war
After 1597, initial Ottoman victory looked more like stalemate. The imperial army took Győr in 1598 and Székesfehérvár in 1601; the Ottoman army took Nagykanizsa in 1600 and Székesfehérvárin in 1602.

Ottoman tacticians complained that they were outgunned, but they were also better organized and did not have to rely on Habsburgs. When the war turned into the Bocskai revolt in 1604, both parties welcomed the 1606 Zsitvatorok peace, weary of destruction and the toll on their treasuries.

Prelude
Nagykanizsa fell to Tiryaki Hasan Pasha in 1600, and the Ottoman Pasha took command of the fort with a garrison of 7,000 men. The captured town became the capital of Kanije Eyalet, an administrative unit of the Ottoman Empire that lasted until the empire's collapse at the end of the century. Kanije Eyalet combined the territory around Nagykanizsa with Zigetvar Eyalet, established in 1596 from parts of Bosnia and another province. This new Ottoman province was only twenty miles from the Austrian duchy of Styria and "caused consternation at the imperial court and at the Holy See." Clement VIII decreed a third invasion of Hungary, this time under his nephew Gian Francesco Aldobrandini. Aldobrandini would die during the siege and later be buried in the Saint Maria sopra Minerva in Rome.

The Ottoman army pulled most of its soldiers from the region after these conquests. Ferdinand II, commander of the Habsburg coalition army, saw an opportunity and laid siege to Nagykanizsa on 9 September 1601 with an army of 100,000 men, cutting all supply routes to the fortress.

Siege
The Habsburg coalition had 100,000 men and 40 cannons, as well as soldiers from Italy, Spain, Hungary, Croatia, Malta, and Walloon and Italian mercenaries of the Vatican. The Ottoman forces, consisting of only 6,000 Turkish men, 3,000 janissaries, and 100 small cannons, had  limited food and weapons, so Tiryaki Hasan Pasha initially ordered his troops to use only their muskets.

Ferdinand ordered an attack, thinking that the Ottomans only had muskets. This mistake led the coalition army into a trap. The 100 cannons caused heavy losses; coalition forces redoubled their efforts and saw even more losses.

Tiryaki Hasan Pasha used psychological warfare, pretending he had enough food and arms to resist coalition attacks for a long time. He also sent messages that the Ottoman army in Belgrade was on its way to lift the siege on Nagykanizsa. All these things were written on notes and placed in the pockets of dead soldiers, lying outside the fortress.

This news angered Ferdinand II even more and resulted in even more and severe attacks on the fortress. To keep its own the morale high and make it seem that the Ottomans were feasting daily, Hasan ordered the military band to play every day.

After two months the Ottoman army had severe food and ammunition shortages. Captain Ahmed Agha said he could make gunpowder if he had supply some needed substances. This allowed the Ottomans to defend the fortress for 2-3 more weeks. After that period the Ottomans nearly ran out all of their supplies.

As winter approached, the Ottomans had to do something or starve or surrender. Desperate, they attacked on the night of 18 November 1601, the 73rd day of the siege, in a surprise attack. Ferdinand II was caught off guard, and thought that Ottoman reinforcements had come. He ordered his exhausted and reduced army to pull back. Following this victory, Sultan Mehmed III promoted Tiryaki Hasan Pasha to the rank of Vizier.

Aftermath
Tiryaki Hasan Pasha was promoted to beylerbey (high governor) of Bosnia, 

Tiryaki Hasan Pasha was in charge of Hungarian provinces for ten years until his death. Sultan Mehmed III died in 1603.

References 

Sieges involving Hungary
Sieges involving the Ottoman Empire
Conflicts in 1601
17th century in Hungary
1601 in the Ottoman Empire
1601 in the Habsburg monarchy
Battles of the Long Turkish War
Ferdinand II, Holy Roman Emperor
History of Zala County